KDAL (610 kHz) is a commercial AM radio station in Duluth, Minnesota, serving the Duluth-Superior area of Northeastern Minnesota and Northwestern Wisconsin.  KDAL is owned and operated by Midwest Communications and broadcasts a talk radio format.  The radio studios and offices for KDAL, KDAL-FM, KDKE, WDSM, WDUL and KTCO are at 11 East Superior Street, Suite 380, in downtown Duluth.

By day, KDAL is powered at 5,000 watts non-directional.  At night, to protect other stations on 610 AM, KDAL uses a directional antenna.  Programming is also heard on 250 watt FM translator W280FB at 103.9 MHz.

Programming
Weekdays begin with Dave Stranberg and the KDAL Morning Show, featuring news, sports, weather, school closings and local information.  Bruce Ciskie hosts a late morning sports show and Bob Sansevere is heard in afternoons.  The rest of the weekday schedule comes from nationally syndicated talk shows including "The Ramsey Show with Dave Ramsey," "Markley, VanCamp and Robbins," "Our American Stories with Lee Habeeb," "Ground Zero with Clyde Lewis," "This Morning, America's First News with Gordon Deal" and "Coast to Coast AM with George Noory."

Weekends feature shows on health, money, religion, technology, travel, cars and home repair, with a polka music show on Saturday mornings.  Weekend syndicated shows include "Leo Laporte, The Tech Guy," "Somewhere in Time with Art Bell" and "World Travel Connection with Rudy Maxa."  KDAL broadcasts Minnesota Twins baseball, University of Minnesota Duluth college football and basketball.  Most hours begin with world and national news from CBS Radio News.  Local news and weather is supplied by KBJR-TV.

History

The KDAL call sign came from the founder's name, Dalton A. LeMasurier. LeMasurier was President and General Manager of the station for many years. On September 5, 1937, power increased to 250 watts and the station joined the CBS Radio network. KDAL broadcast CBS's dramas, comedies, news, sports, soap operas, game shows and big band broadcasts during the "Golden Age of Radio." With the enactment of the North American Regional Broadcasting Agreement (NARBA), the station moved to 1490 kHz in early 1941.

KDAL switched dial positions to the current 610 kHz on October 24, 1941, increasing power to 1,000 watts. The switchover was dramatically made from a plane flying over the city. In 1947, a new transmitter and tower were constructed at 63rd Avenue West along the harborfront. The facilities remain to this day. KDAL got another power increase again to 5,000 watts on August 7, 1947.  A new transmitter and tower were constructed for the boost in wattage. This enabled KDAL to serve a wider area. The event was celebrated with a "Kilowatt Karnival" in the Duluth Armory.

In the 1948-1949 season, CBS raided NBC and grabbed some of their biggest stars. Radio's highest rated program, "The Jack Benny Program", moved to CBS and KDAL in January, 1949. "Amos 'n' Andy", "George Burns & Gracie Allen", "Edgar Bergen & Charlie McCarthy" and Bing Crosby also made the switch. CBS was suddenly the number one network and KDAL finally made some headway against NBC's WEBC.

KDAL made the jump to television as KDAL-TV (now KDLH) in 1953. FM station KDAL-FM went on the air in 1985.

Network programming moved from radio to television in the 1950s.  KDAL featured a full service, middle of the road (MOR) format of popular music, news and sports in the 1950s, 60s and 70s.  In the 80s and 90s, the music was updated to adult contemporary.  By the late 1990s, the music shows were eliminated and the station became a full time talk outlet.

References

External links
KDAL website
Twin Ports Broadcasting

News and talk radio stations in the United States
Radio stations in Duluth, Minnesota
Radio stations established in 1936
1936 establishments in Minnesota
Midwest Communications radio stations